Jack Gideon McFarland (born November 18, 1969) is a Republican member of the Louisiana House of Representatives for District 13, which encompasses Bienville, Jackson, Ouachita, and Winn parishes in north Louisiana. On January 11, 2016, McFarland succeeded outgoing Republican Representative James R. Fannin, who was elected to the District 35 seat in the Louisiana State Senate in the nonpartisan blanket primary held on October 24, 2015.

In that same primary, McFarland, with 7,719 votes (60.3 percent), defeated his Democratic opponent, Philip Lawrence, who polled 5,091 votes (39.7 percent).

References 

1969 births
Living people
People from Winnfield, Louisiana
People from Crossett, Arkansas
Republican Party members of the Louisiana House of Representatives
Parish jurors and commissioners in Louisiana
21st-century American politicians
People from Winn Parish, Louisiana
People from Dodson, Louisiana